The 1999 Las Vegas 400 was the third stock car race of the 1999 NASCAR Winston Cup Series season, the second of five No Bull 5 races of the 1999 season, and the second iteration of the event. The race was held on Sunday, March 7, 1999, in North Las Vegas, Nevada at Las Vegas Motor Speedway, a  permanent D-shaped oval racetrack. The race took the scheduled 267 laps to complete. In the closing laps of the race, Roush Racing driver Jeff Burton would manage to be victorious in a battle with Bill Davis Racing driver and brother Ward Burton to win his sixth career NASCAR Winston Cup Series victory and his first of the season. To fill out the podium, Ward Burton and Hendrick Motorsports driver Jeff Gordon would finish second and third, respectively.

Background 

Las Vegas Motor Speedway, located in Clark County, Nevada in Las Vegas, Nevada about 15 miles northeast of the Las Vegas Strip, is a  complex of multiple tracks for motorsports racing. The complex is owned by Speedway Motorsports, Inc., which is headquartered in Charlotte, North Carolina.

Entry list 

 (R) denotes rookie driver.

Practice

First practice 
The first practice session was held on Friday, March 5, at 10:30 AM PST. The session would last for two hours and 25 minutes.

Second practice 
The second practice session was held on Saturday, March 6, at 9:00 AM PST. The session would last for one hour and 30 minutes.

Final practice 
The final practice session, sometimes referred to as Happy Hour, was held on Saturday, March 6, after the preliminary 1999 Sam's Town 300. The session would last for one hour.

Qualifying 
Qualifying was split into two rounds. The first round was held on Friday, March 5, at 2:00 PM PST. Each driver would have one lap to set a time. During the first round, the top 25 drivers in the round would be guaranteed a starting spot in the race. If a driver was not able to guarantee a spot in the first round, they had the option to scrub their time from the first round and try and run a faster lap time in a second round qualifying run, held on Saturday, March 6, at 11:30 AM PST. As with the first round, each driver would have one lap to set a time. Positions 26-36 would be decided on time, while positions 37-43 would be based on provisionals. Six spots are awarded by the use of provisionals based on owner's points. The seventh is awarded to a past champion who has not otherwise qualified for the race. If no past champion needs the provisional, the next team in the owner points will be awarded a provisional.

Eight drivers would fail to qualify: Ted Musgrave, Kyle Petty, Robert Pressley, Ron Hornaday Jr., Butch Gilliland, Dave Marcis, Morgan Shepherd, and Ron Burns.

Full qualifying results 

*Time not available.

Race results

References 

1999 NASCAR Winston Cup Series
NASCAR races at Las Vegas Motor Speedway
March 1999 sports events in the United States
1999 in sports in Nevada